Canada Cup may refer to:

 The World Cup of Golf (previous name)

Professional sporting events held in Canada:

 Canada Cup for men's professional ice hockey
 Canada Cup (curling) for men's and women's curling
 Canada Cup (fighting game event)
 Canada Cup (floorball) for men, women's, and youth floorball
 Canada Cup (golf)
 Canada Cup (rugby) for women's rugby union
 Canada Cup (soccer)
 Canadian Cup of Soccer, the Canadian Championship of Soccer
 Canada Cup (softball) for women's fastpitch softball
 Open Canada Cup (defunct) for men's soccer
 Canada's Cup, for match race yachting

See also
 Canadian Open (disambiguation)
 Canadian Championships (disambiguation)
 Air Canada Cup (1979-2003), midget hockey trophy
 Canadian National Challenge Cup, soccer
 FEI Nations Cup of Canada for equestrian
 Kanada-malja, translates to Canada Cup in Finnish, serves as the championship trophy for Liiga
 Western Canada Cup, Junior A hockey trophy